Sina Motalebi (born 21 April 1973) is an Iranian journalist, based in London. He was the Editor of ZigZag magazine, a website based on the content of journalists and citizen's contributions following their distance journalism training course provided by the BBC World Service Trust.

Career 
He started his career in 1991 as a film critic and later began to write political and cultural columns and commentary for several reformist newspapers. He has joined the Persian Section of BBC World Service as a multimedia producer in 2004. He graduated from Tehran University, Faculty of Law and Political Science. After most of the Iranian reformist publications were banned by the government, Sina started blogging in his personal weblog, Webgard (also known as Rooznegar).

On 20 April 2003 he was arrested by intelligence division of law enforcement because of his writings in his weblog and newspapers, and his interviews with foreign media. He was detained 23 days in solitary confinement in a secret detention centre before he was released on bail.

In December 2003 Sina left the country for the Netherlands where he sought asylum. He recalled his experiences in his weblog as well as a joint press conference held by Human Rights Watch and Reporters sans frontières (in June 2004).

The judiciary responded by arresting his father, Saeed Motalebi and charged him with "assisting the escape of an accused person," an apparent reference to his son's departure from Iran, despite the fact that Sina Motalebi left Iran legally. Saeed Motalebi was detained for 10 days in a secret detention centre before being released. During his detention Pedram Moallemian, an Iranian blogger and activist, campaigned for his release.

Awards and honors 
1997 – The First Prize at the National Press Festival, Tehran
2005 – Hellman/Hammett Grant by Human Rights Watch

References

Sources
 Sina Motalebi's father arrested – IFEX

1973 births
Living people
Iranian journalists
Iranian bloggers
Iranian emigrants to the United Kingdom
BBC newsreaders and journalists
BBC World Service people
People from Tehran
University of Tehran alumni
Online journalists